Maria Usifo (born 1 August 1964) is Nigerian athlete and former Olympian who represented Nigeria at Los Angeles (1984) and Seoul (1988) Olympic Games. She specialized in the 100 and 400 metres hurdles. She is one of the female athletes in Nigerian sports history who dominated athletic events both at national and international levels.

Career in sports 
Usifo started her career in sports in Nigeria in the 1970s when the school sports system was functional. She was a former hurdler and quarter-miler whose athletic opened opportunities for her to choose from 10 foreign universities after her outstanding performance at the Commonwealth Games in Brisbane, Australia in 1982. She participated in the Olympic Games in Los Angeles in 1984 and Seoul in 1988. Usifo was All-Africa Games Gold medallist and African Championships Gold medallist.

International competitions

1989 African Championships - gold medal (400 m h)
1988 African Championships - gold medal (100 m h)
1988 African Championships - gold medal (400 m h)
1985 African Championships - gold medal (100 m h)
1985 African Championships - silver medal (400 m h)
1984 African Championships - gold medal (100 m h)

References

External links

1964 births
Living people
Nigerian female hurdlers
Olympic athletes of Nigeria
Athletes (track and field) at the 1984 Summer Olympics
Athletes (track and field) at the 1988 Summer Olympics
World Athletics Championships athletes for Nigeria
African Games gold medalists for Nigeria
African Games medalists in athletics (track and field)
Commonwealth Games competitors for Nigeria
Athletes (track and field) at the 1982 Commonwealth Games
Athletes (track and field) at the 1994 Commonwealth Games
Athletes (track and field) at the 1987 All-Africa Games
Universiade medalists in athletics (track and field)
Universiade bronze medalists for Nigeria
20th-century Nigerian women